Thitarodes is a genus of moths of the family Hepialidae. In English Thitarodes is known as "ghost moth". They are found in eastern Asia. The majority are restricted to the Tibetan Plateau. Often in Chinese entomological nomenclature Thitarodes is still referred to as Hepialus, although the name was changed back in 1968. Furthermore, some authors use incorrectly the term "bat moth" which is a bad translation of the Chinese term for ghost moth.

Many larvae of this genus are the hosts to the parasitic fungus Ophiocordyceps sinensis. The fungus-insect complex known as caterpillar fungus, or by its original Tibetan name yartsa gunbu (or its Nepali pidgin version yarsa gumba). It was first used in traditional Tibetan medicine, but is now highly prized by practitioners of traditional Chinese medicine who know it as dong chong xiacao or short chong cao.

Species
Thitarodes albipictus – China (Yunnan)
Thitarodes arizanus – Taiwan
Thitarodes armoricanus – China (Tibet Autonomous Region)
Thitarodes baimaensis – China (Yunnan)
Thitarodes baqingensis – China (Tibet AR)
Thitarodes bibelteus
Thitarodes biruensis
Thitarodes caligophilus
Thitarodes callinivalis – China (Yunnan)
Thitarodes cingulatus – China (Gansu)
Thitarodes damxungensis – China (Tibet AR)
Thitarodes danieli – Nepal
Thitarodes deqinensis
Thitarodes dierli – Nepal
Thitarodes dinggyeensis
Thitarodes dongyuensis – China
Thitarodes eberti – Nepal
Thitarodes ferrugineus – China (Yunnan)
Thitarodes gonggaensis – China (Sichuan)
Thitarodes hainanensis
Thitarodes jiachaensis
Thitarodes jialangensis – China (Tibet AR)
Thitarodes jinshaensis – China (Yunnan)
Thitarodes kangdingensis – China (Sichuan)
Thitarodes kangdingroides – China (Kangding area, Sichuan)
Thitarodes latitegumenus
Thitarodes litangensis – China (Sichuan)
Thitarodes malaisei – Myanmar
Thitarodes markamensis – China (Tibet AR)
Thitarodes meiliensis – China (Yunnan)
Thitarodes namensis
Thitarodes namlinensis
Thitarodes namnai
Thitarodes nipponensis – Japan
Thitarodes oblifurcus – China (Qinghai)
Thitarodes pratensis – China (Yunnan)
Thitarodes pui
Thitarodes renzhiensis – China (Yunnan)
Thitarodes richthofeni – China
Thitarodes sejilaensis
Thitarodes sinarabesca – China
Thitarodes shambalaensis – China (Sichuan)
Thitarodes varians – China (Tibet AR)
Thitarodes variabilis – Far east of Russia
Thitarodes varius – Far east of Russia
Thitarodes xizangensis – China (Tibet AR)
Thitarodes xunhuaensis – China (Qinghai)
Thitarodes yadongensis
Thitarodes yeriensis – China (Yunnan)
Thitarodes yongshengensis
Thitarodes zaliensis – China (Tibet AR)
Thitarodes zhangmoensis – China (Xinjiang)
Thitarodes zhongzhiensis – China (Yunnan)

Former species
Thitarodes anomopterus – China (Yunnan)
Thitarodes jianchuanensis – China (Yunnan)
Thitarodes lijiangensis – China (Yunnan)
Thitarodes luquensis – China (Gansu)
Thitarodes menyuanicus – China (Qinghai)
Thitarodes nebulosus – China (Tibet AR)
Thitarodes sichuanus – China (Yunnan)
Thitarodes yulongensis – China (Yunnan)
Thitarodes yunlongensis – China (Yunnan)
Thitarodes yunnanensis – China (Yunnan)
Thitarodes zhayuensis – China (Tibet AR)

References

 Wang X-L, Yao Y-J (2011) Host insect species of Ophiocordyceps sinensis: a review. ZooKeys 127: 43–59.

External links
Hepialidae genera

Hepialidae
Fauna of Yunnan
Exoporia genera
Taxa named by Pierre Viette